Roy Francisco Sáenz Acuña (born 5 December 1944, in Limón) is a retired Costa Rican football player, who used to play as a striker.

Club career
Sáenz made his Primera División debut for Barrio México and played a major part of his career for Alajuelense. He was top scorer of the Primera División twice, in 1969 and 1971 and totalled 168 goals in the Costa Rica Primera División in 363 matches. He scored a total of 234 goals in all competitions. (league, cup, national team and internal club matches) He won two league titles with and scored 84 goals for Liga, ranking him 3rd on the club's all-time goalscorers list.

Sáenz had a short spell abroad with Salvadoran side Universidad and retired in 1980.

International career
Saéz was also part of the Ticos, playing 27 games and scoring 12 goals. He represented his country in 4 FIFA World Cup qualification matches and scored during the 1969 CONCACAF Championship.

Managerial career
After retiring, Sáenz managed second division sides El Carmen, Palmares, Uruguay de Coronado, La Unión, Curridabat and Puriscal. He also worked as a sales executive. In summer 2010 he was chosen as president of former club Barrio México on their return to the Primera División. He replaced Brujas president Minor Vargas who was not allowed to lead two different clubs.

References

1944 births
Living people
People from Limón Province
Association football forwards
Costa Rican footballers
Costa Rica international footballers
L.D. Alajuelense footballers
Liga FPD players
Costa Rican expatriate footballers
Expatriate footballers in El Salvador
Costa Rican expatriate sportspeople in El Salvador
Costa Rican football managers
CONCACAF Championship-winning players